Mendota can refer to any of the following places in the United States:
 Mendota, California
 Mendota, Illinois, a city in LaSalle County
 Mendota Township, LaSalle County, Illinois
 Mendota, Minnesota
 Mendota Heights, Minnesota
 Mendota, Virginia
 Mendota, Washington
 Lake Mendota, Madison, Wisconsin